The American Leopard Hound is an American breed of hunting dog. It is recognized by the  United Kennel Club (UKC) as a scenthound and is in the American Kennel Club's Foundation Stock Service.

Characteristics

The American Leopard Hound is 21 to 27 inches tall and may weigh from 35 to 75 pounds. It comes in a leopard or spotted pattern and may be red, blue, merle, brindle, black or another color, with white making up less than a third of the coat. The American Leopard Hound has a dense, short coat, medium-length drop ears and may have yellow, brown, or blue eyes.

History
The American Leopard Hound is thought to be descended from dogs brought to the New World by Spanish conquistadors to Mexico. It was later brought to the United States by settlers who used it to hunt hogs. It was recognized as the Leopard Cur by the UKC in 1998. The name was changed to American Leopard Hound in 2008. While the American Leopard Hound is not formally recognized by the AKC, it is in their Foundation Stock Service, and has been since 2012.

See also
 Dogs portal
 List of dog breeds
 Catahoula Leopard Dog

References

Dog breeds originating in the United States